, is a Japanese politician and the current mayor of Nagasaki, the capital city of Nagasaki Prefecture, Japan, he first took office in 2007.

Life 
Taue is a graduate of Kyushu University, and majored in jurisprudence.

He began his career as a civil servant at the municipal government, which he first joined in 1980, eventually serving as a department manager of the statistics department.

Taue was elected mayor of Nagasaki in a special election in 2007 following the assassination of Iccho Itoh in the midst of the 2007 unified local elections. He was re-elected in the April 2011 elections and ran unopposed in the April 2015 elections, the first uncontested mayoral election in Nagasaki history.

In 2007, he criticized Fumio Kyuma, then the Minister of Defense, as the mayor of Nagasaki for his remark on the atomic bombings of Hiroshima and Nagasaki in 1945.

References

External links 
 CityMayors profile

Mayors of Nagasaki
Japanese anti–nuclear weapons activists
1956 births
Living people
Kyushu University alumni